The 1970 Dwars door België was the 26th edition of the Dwars door Vlaanderen cycle race and was held on 22 March 1970. The race started and finished in Waregem. The race was won by Daniel Van Ryckeghem.

General classification

References

1970
1970 in road cycling
1970 in Belgian sport